Angra Toldo is a village in Caué District on São Tomé Island in São Tomé and Príncipe. Its population is 433 (2012 census). It is located on the coast, northeast of São João dos Angolares and southwest of Ribeira Afonso.

Population history

References

Populated places in Caué District
Populated coastal places in São Tomé and Príncipe